Dianjiang County is a county in the northeast of Chongqing Municipality, China, bordering Sichuan province to the northwest. As of 2015, it has two subdistricts, two townships, and 22 towns under its administration.

History 
Dianjiang County was developed in the time of the Western Wei Emperor Gong Di in 555 CE. Before the Chongqing area became a municipality, Dianjiang belonged to other regions. From October 1, 1949, to March 14, 1997, it belonged to Dazhu, Fuling prefecture.

Administrative divisions 
Dianjiang has two subdistricts, two townships, five regional center towns and 17 general towns.

Climate

Economics 
Based on statistics from October 2015, in the first three quarters, Dianjiang County achieved a GDP of 16.63 billion yuan (an increase of 11.4 percent, and faster than the growth in the previous six months by 0.4 percentage points). The contributions to the GDP were composed of the primary sector producing 2.17 billion yuan (an increase of 4.5%); the secondary sector producing 8.78 billion yuan (an increase of 12.6%); and the tertiary sector producing 5.68 billion yuan (an increase of 12.2%).

Transportation 
The area is served by Dianjiang railway station on the Chongqing–Wanzhou intercity railway.

References 

County-level divisions of Chongqing